Sir Owen Thomas, JP, DL (18 December 1858 – 6 March 1923) was a Welsh politician who served as the Member of Parliament (MP) for Anglesey.

Born on Anglesey, Thomas raised the Prince of Wales Light Horse regiment to serve in the Second Boer War.  He commanded the regiment, and later became the Brigadier-General commanding the North Wales Brigade.  He also served as chief officer of the Life-Saving Apparatus at Sea section of the Board of Trade, and in his spare time bred farm stock.

Thomas took an interest in politics, and stood unsuccessfully for the Liberal Party in Oswestry at the 1895 United Kingdom general election.  At the 1918 United Kingdom general election, he was elected for Anglesey as an independent labour candidate.  He joined the Labour Party group in Parliament, but resigned the party whip in 1920, and was re-elected in 1922 as an independent.  He died in 1923, causing the 1923 Anglesey by-election.

He was knighted on 21 February 1917.

References

External links 
 

1858 births
1923 deaths
British Army brigadiers
Welsh military personnel
Welsh Labour Party MPs
UK MPs 1918–1922
UK MPs 1922–1923
Independent members of the House of Commons of the United Kingdom
Knights Bachelor
British Army generals of World War I
Liberal Party (UK) parliamentary candidates